The Slaver is a 1927 American drama film directed by Harry Revier and starring Pat O'Malley, Carmelita Geraghty and John Miljan.

Cast
 Pat O'Malley as Dick Farnum 
 Carmelita Geraghty as Natalie Rivers 
 John Miljan as Cyril Blake 
 J.P. McGowan as 'Iron' Larsen 
 Billie Bennett as Mrs. Rivers 
 William Earle as Gumbo 
 Leo White
 Philip Sleeman

References

Bibliography
 Munden, Kenneth White. The American Film Institute Catalog of Motion Pictures Produced in the United States, Part 1. University of California Press, 1997.

External links

1927 films
1927 drama films
Silent American drama films
Films directed by Harry Revier
American silent feature films
1920s English-language films
American black-and-white films
1920s American films